La Florida (Spanish for "the flowery") is an urban-suburban commune of Chile located in the South East of Santiago, Santiago Metropolitan Region. It is a residential area and its inhabitants are mostly members of a new middle to upper-middle class. It ranks number 12 out of 346 among Chilean communes in terms of Human Development Index. Its mayor is Rodolfo Carter (Chile Vamos).

Demographics
It currently has 402,433 inhabitants, which makes it the fourth most populous commune in Chile, after Puente Alto, Maipú and Santiago.

Stats
Population below poverty line: 3.1% (2015)
Regional quality of life index: 80.21, high, 13 out of 52 (2005)
Human Development Index: 0.773, 12 out of 346  (2005)

Administration
As a commune, La Florida is a third-level administrative division of Chile administered by a municipal council, headed by an alcalde who is directly elected every four years. The 2016-2020 alcalde is Rodolfo Carter Fernández (Chile Vamos), who has been the mayor since 2011.

The local council has the following members:

Conservatives (6)
 Oscar Aguilera (UDI)
 Eulogia Lavín (UDI)
 Marcelo Zunino (RN)
 Orlando Vidal (RN)
 Felipe Mancilla (RN)
 Verónica Füller (Evopoli)

Christian Democrats (1)
 Claudio Arredondo (independent)

Social Democrats (3)
 Nicanor Herrera  (PS)
 Marcela Abedrapo (PC)
 Nicolás Hurtado (PC)

The municipal council is composed by six members of Chile Vamos (conservatives), one Christian Democrat and three Social Democrats, plus the mayor Rodolfo Carter (Chile Vamos)

Within the electoral divisions of Chile, La Florida is represented in the Chamber of Deputies by Gustavo Hasbún (UDI) and Camila Vallejo-Dowling (PC)  as part of the 26th District, which consists entirely of the La Florida commune. It is represented in the Senate by Manuel José Ossandón (Conservative independent) and Carlos Montes (PS) as part of the 8th Senatorial Constituency (East Santiago).

Last elections 
2016 local elections in La Florida

Education
Previously the area had a German school, Deutsche Marienschule Santiago-La Florida.

There is also an English school, The American–British School of La Florida.

References

External links
  Municipality of La Florida

Florida
Communes of Chile
Populated places established in 1899
1899 establishments in Chile